Y. Misdaq  Yoshi (born in Brighton, England) is an Afghan-English multimedia artist, writer, creative consultant, and is founder of the art website Nefisa, which also doubles as the independent media label Nefisa UK. Since 2004 he has released four albums, three documentaries, and three novels, and from 2010 to 2012 worked on a poetry series (six separate volumes of poetry) as well as appearing on numerous works, either anonymously or under different pseudonyms as writer, filmmaker, and performer.

Y. Misdaq has been featured in magazines such as The Wire, Hip-Hop Connection, Stylus, The Brighton Source, and numerous others. Upon the publication of his debut novel in June 2007, Misdaq's work was also featured on BBC Television & Radio. On September 18, 2009 he was featured on NPR in the United States. and PRI internationally.

Misdaq was present in Benghazi at the onset of the 2011 Libyan civilian uprising against Muammar Gaddafi, which he covered alongside Anjali Kamat for Democracy Now!.

Early stages of Nefisa UK
An ethnic Zazai Pashtun Y. Misdaq was born and raised in Brighton on the south coast of England. His father, Dr. Nabi Misdaq, is an eminent scholar and author on the social and political history of Afghanistan and was also head of the BBC World Service Pashto Section – which he founded – for a decade in the 1990s. His mother, Arian Misdaq, also an Afghan originally from Kabul, is a psychoanalyst specialising in multi-cultural counseling, working with CMHS.

In 2002 he began Nefisa, an amorphous art collective that featured Misdaq's frequent updates and comments on creative, spiritual, and political topics. It also featured early work of many other artists including Julia Clark-Lowes (who went on to form The Pipettes and The Indelicates), San Francisco graffiti artist Daniel Cordani, avant-garde musician and erstwhile Hollywood film composer Michl Britsch. Misdaq frequently used the website to comment upon immediate news events such as the Iraq War, the 7/7 bombings of London and the Danish cartoon controversy – for which he wrote a combined short-story and article which was spread widely across the internet. Similarly, it was a small creative hub for community activities such as annual soup drives for the homeless of the city Brighton. and anti-war marches in Brighton and London. Misdaq spoke at length about Nefisa in a 2011 interview with the UK's Radical Middle Way. "It was [also] pretty special in that it was a precursor to Myspace and Facebook. Each artist I featured would have their own profiles, one photograph only; they listed their influences and such, but crucially, they also had their own galleries of ongoing work… So that gave certain artists the feeling that their creative output had a potential audience, and this in itself was a meaning-giver for a lot of those artists, crucial to a few of them. So, you could say it was a committedly non-commercial variant of a social network, with deeper social implications. If all of today's trendy technologies truly encouraged people's innate creativity, instead of just talking like they do, then that would be great." In 2007, after five years of operation, Nefisa UK ceased as a blog/showcase and energies were focused solely on its capacity as a media label.

Music

Solo albums

From a Western Box 
(Released 5 March 2004)

His music debut, From a Western Box (released on Nefisa UK) is described as political hip-hop fused with electronica and was well received by the underground music & arts press. A PRI radio show called 'Taking on the Taliban' also featured the title track when it aired in the United States in November 2009.

It was described by the now-defunct alternative culture magazine Punk Planet as "An effortless combination of electronica, hip-hop & the stylised mood of ambient... Tight tracks with smart vocal infusions and political narratives." (Sep/Oct issue #63)."
UK Hip-Hop also reviewed the album, claiming it was, "What hip-hop always was about, appropriating and re-interpreting the heritage of the old-school."
Finally, Stylus Magazine's Nick Southall wrote, "Yoshi comes from a world where Sergio Leone, the RZA, anti-establishment politics, Middle Eastern strife, ambient Hip Hop, Akira Kurosawa and potent skunk exist in harmony...Managing to sound both ominous and chilled at the same time, this is obviously a deeply personal record about skewed perspectives, about looking at the UK from its marginal areas and wondering whether you're a part of it." (Nick Southall)

Track-Listing

"Tears from a Box (Intro)" – 0:51
"The Sickness (Digital Living)" – 4:42
"A'salaam Alaikum, How Do U Do?" – 4:16
"Idol Smash" – 3:53
"Karzai Splits" – 1:05
"My View" – 3:23
"Sunline" – 5:32
"From a Western Box" – 5:03
"Guantanamo Convo (Skit)" – 0:38
"Misty" – 7:32
"Nightmare on Terror" – 4:04 	
"Untitled Hidden Track" – 4:09

Flowers & Trees 
(Released 17 May 2005)

The second release Flowers & Trees (also released on Nefisa UK) was considerably more positive and also slightly more traditional in terms of the hip-hop tracks featured. Just like his debut, Flowers & Trees also contained an almost equal split between instrumental songs and vocal ones. This album was also notorious for being marketed with a free piece of nature inside the CD case, which online customers could choose from (such choices as white-flowers, cherry blossoms, grass, and even oxygen were available).

The WIRE Magazine said that Yoshi's, "Art, as well as his heart, is in the right place." While also praising his"Lateral sound leaps and abrupt left-turns."
Hip-Hop Connection's Adam Anonymous, gave 'Flowers & Trees' 4 out of 5 Stars, beating off competition from the likes of Snoop Dogg with the highest rating that month. "Brighton-born Yoshi is a real one-man DIY operation, thankfully without ever compromising quality... Marrying DJ Shadow's aural patchwork approach with Danger Mouse's disregard for sample chiefing, Yoshi is patently enjoying complete freedom of sound... Beautiful."

Yoshi played the album tracks live on many occasions, playing in Brighton at the Pav Tav, Engine Rooms, Enigma, London in Richmond, and the Ritzy Cinema in Brixton and at the International Convention Centre, Birmingham amongst others. The title track was also played on national radio through BBC Radio 1Xtra in June 2005.

Track-Listing

"Planting a Seed" – 	3:41 	
"When U See The Future" –	5:03 	
"Dami / The Beautiful Truth" – 	3:57 	
"Dream" –	4:26 	
"'Scepter & Yoshi Talkin'" – 3:55 	
"Flowers & Trees" – 5:04 	
"Intermission" – 	0:29 	
"The Funk" – 	4:46 	
"Afghan Eagle" – 	1:07 	
"Afghan Eagle Descending" – 	4:17 	
"Under" – 	1:13 	
"Bubbles Babies Magic" – 	2:20 	
"No-one Can, Will" –	6:01 	
"Home (Hidden Track)" –        	2:36

Maghreb, Isha & Space 
(23 March 2010, CD)

Misdaq's third LP, coming some five years after his sophomore effort, marked an evolution from his previous work. Maghreb Isha & Space (Arabic words connoting the sunset and evening prayers) combined numerous concepts of Islamic mysticism with abstract 'sections' of music, including live Afghan (and Western) folk-music, as well as that of the Far-East. Lyrically, it also deepened a fascination with 'wordlessness' in lyrics, with Misdaq citing the Cocteau Twins as an influence in this regard, on an interview available with the album's mini-site. Most of the LP was recorded in single takes and with live instrumentation (as opposed to sampling) with Misdaq playing Harmonium, Rubab and Guitar and Gimbri on numerous songs, while largely for the first time, singing (his more staple delivery of MC'ing only featured on two songs).

Misdaq dedicated the album to the avante-garde poet & novelist Lawrence Ytzakh Braithwaite who died in mysterious circumstances in 2008 (see 'Collaborations' for further elaboration).

The two videos accompanying the album ("Dawn Song" and "Song of Delicious Affirmation") marked Misdaq's first officially released music videos, displaying themes of Islamic spirituality, improvisational dance (often by Misdaq himself) and 'visual-sampling' from online sources such as YouTube.

Track-Listing

"Dawn Song" – 	5:41
"Mika's Morning Song" – 	2:20
"Enough is Enough Day (1st Prelude)" – 	4:10
"Oma-Say, Oma-Sah, a Makusa (The Journalists, The Audience & The Artist)" –
"Freestyle in McDonalds" – 	3:50
"Time Ain't on Your Side" – 	3:46 	
"I am Alone (2nd Prelude)" – 	2:46
"No Mystery" – 	4:08
"Falling Asleep on the Ride Home (Happiness)" – 2:54
"Dream Suite: i) Toki / The Untangling ii) Song of Delicious Affirmation iii) Returning Dream about Eternity / The Stars in Space" – 	9:41
"Love Song" – 	5:14 	
"The Golden Circle (Binds with Love)" – 	4:54

If You Ask Me, Yes 
(14 February 2012, CD)

Yoshi's fourth studio LP is the largest and most ambitious project to date. In July 2012, it became the first successful Kickstarter fundraising project for a contemporary Muslim artist, with Yusuf managing to raise over $5,000 from fans in less than 30 days. Consequently, 'Yes,' is also the first of Misdaq's albums to be recorded exclusively at an external recording studio (Cue Recording in Falls Church, Virginia). The album was made available as a digital pre-order on 1 February, and was released on Valentines Day, 2013.

 Rivers of Peace
 Get Great	
 Siamese Connection	
 Cho Sun Dynasty Jewel
 Garden of Delight
 Don't Be Sad Ones	
 The tea-in-Manhattan-song is a great song
 The City is a Golden Forest
 Perfect
 I am a Musician	
 i) Butterflies Believe in Peace because they Are Peace ii) World Disasters on the Increase circa 2010 iii) Down iv) Share!
 The Life of Excitement
 If You Asked me
 Fountain Rap Spirit
 Harmonica Freestyle
 Here
 Are You a Diamond-Studded Library?	
 Listen (Sound of the Divine)
 Evolution

Misted Almond Legacy 
(16 November 2017, Digital Release)

Written and recorded entirely in Honolulu, Hawai'i. According to the album liner notes from ymisdaq.bandcamp.com, this album was conceived in a dream while Misdaq was living in the suburbs of Manoa, and completed in Makiki, both in Honolulu. The album artwork was by German artist Miriam Tolke, continuing a trend of collaborations with female visuals artists that has spanned every one of Misdaq's LP's.

Collaborations, B-sides and uncredited work
In 2004 Yoshi remixed a song by DJ Shadow, "Blood on the Motorway (No More Bush-Fires – The Life Remix)". According to the press release of his debut album, this remains one of the more popular downloads on the official Solesides website, which features the song.

First and foremost have been his collaborations with Afghan-American Producer/MC Diamondscepter, who lent a beat and lyrics to Yoshi's debut, and also produced a track on Flowers & Trees, co-producing the title track.

Yoshi has worked on much of his more left-field music with Mikrosopht (a.k.a. Ben Kelley). On Mikrosopht's net-label Godxiliary, Yoshi contributed his lyrics and spoken-word vocals to the album C-WILD. Mikrosopht & Yoshi also released a duet-album in June 2007 called Dual Mule, on the Godxiliary imprint, which has the subtitle, 'experiments in improvisational sound'.

In 2008, Yoshi appeared with Mikrosopht and fellow producer/friend Michl Britsch (composer of Hollywood Soundtracks for the films CASE 139 and others), on a Beatles mash-up album called Hippocamp Ruins Sgt. Peppers. MichL Britsch further appeared on If You Ask Me, Yes, as a multi-instrumentalist on the song, "Here".

Victrola (Victor Ramos) is a producer known primarily for his work in the Illinois Hip-Hop duo Mana Republic and has worked with Yoshi on various tracks. The only releases thus far have been the Victrola produced track on The Hearing (on which Yoshi raps) and Victrola's first solo EP, 'Nubes y Pajaritos' ("flowers, clouds, and little birds") on which Yoshi raps on the track, SubwayFN. On this track, Yoshi is said to be assuming the personality of a flower, while fellow MC J-Shillz personifies a cloud. This EP was released on the electronic music label Hippocamp.

Yoshi also wrote a chorus which was sung by two-members of the Pipettes (Becki & former, founding member, Julia) for his Flowers & Trees song, When U See The Future.

Uncredited appearances by Yoshi have been confirmed on Atom's album, Son of a Glitch, where he can be heard rapping verses on the tracks "Men in Black" and "Monaural Moral".

Misdaq's 2009 blog 'Palace Prayers' (later a basis for his poetry book The Beautiful / Palace Prayers) was an online blog that took place during the thirty days of Ramadan in the same year. A blog entry was made each day under the pseudonym 'man in palace' – a fictitious character resembling a prince/artist. The blog contained songs, poetry, short-stories and videos edited by 'Man in Palace'.

The most popular poem, which was later circulated online, was 'Ramadhan 23' – a medium-length piece about the predicament of modern Moslems during ramadan, particularly their tendency to hold public iftars, with an emphasis on transforming them into modern social networking opportunities at the expense of their traditional function as highly intimate and spiritual occasions for faithful Moslems.

Film-making and journalism

Soup for Thought 
(2005)
A short-documentary by Y.Misdaq a.k.a. Yoshi, S. Windericxx & N. Karlsson, about a soup-kitchen providing for the homeless people of Brighton. This documentary was selected for a special screening at the 2005 Brighton Film-Festival in the Duke of York's Picture House.

Let the clouds of America burn Calligraphy onto my Frozen Heart 
(2007)
A 15-minute documentary, filmed directed and edited by Y.Misdaq depicts the mental struggle of an artist in the midst of a creative block. It was first screened at Royal Holloway University of London in March 2007.

[No Title] 
[No title] was included as a DVD with early editions of Misdaq's third LP Maghreb, Isha & Space, and apparently created at roughly the same time as the albums inception (circa summer 2007). It was screened at the 6th World Islamic Economic Forum in Kuala Lumpur,|The Marketplace of Creative Arts, 18–20 May 2010 (see Day 2). Retrieved 5 May 2011</ref> and also at San Francisco's Culture Unplugged Film Festival where it is currently available to view online.

Journalism 
Misdaq was also present in Benghazi, Libya as cameraman, editor and producer for the news and current affairs program Democracy Now! during the shows in-the-field reporting at the outset of the Libyan civilian uprising in February/March 2011. Alongside Democracy Now presenter Anjali Kamut, he filed two stories, one on the exodus of African workers from Libya and the other a feature on an improvised Media Center constructed by the Libyan rebels.

Writing

Books

Pieces of a Paki: A Beautiful Story 
(2007) Nefisa UK/University of Sussex press. 

'Pieces of a paki' is the debut novel of Y.Misdaq a.k.a. Yoshi and is being published under his real name, Yusuf Misdaq, by Nefisa UK in association with the University of Sussex press. It is set in a near-future Britain and was featured briefly in the March edition of Emel magazine.

Frozen Fountain 
(2008). Art book.
A two-way collaboration with German photographer Harry Nizard, Frozen Fountain is the first book to contain Misdaq's poetry, set to the multi-layered photographs of Nizard. Highly abstract and somewhat open-ended both visually and textually, some themes explored include the inside universe, the nature of belief, beauty, the human body and lust. In 2009, the project was finally completed.

Narayan 
(2007). Novel.
As yet unpublished, Narayan is Misdaq's second novel. It was nominated by Penguin for the 2011 Muslim Writers Award, also short-listed in the best unpublished novel category. The story is set in Hounslow.

The Steep Ascent 
(2010). Online book & novel.
The Steep Ascent, so named after an ayah from the Quran, was an online project of Man in Gutter (a.k.a. Yusuf Misdaq) written during Ramadan 2010. The aim was to write an entire book during the month. Concordant with the title, the writing – which is a blend of both morality and extreme-satire – plays on several 'bad-guy' stereotypes, and draws heavily from the Quran and traditional forms of oral-culture, Sufi storytelling. Mo, a young rising star in an unnamed corporate world, befriends Asad, a hot dog vendor.

Brighton Streets 
(2010). Nefisa UK
The first in Misdaq's poetry series, which is a six-part series of poetry books.

Into Solidity 
(2011). Nefisa UK
A book of poems and illustrations.

The Butterfly Gate 
(2011). Nefisa UK
Poems and illustrations.

Spilling Kingdoms 
(2011). Nefisa UK
Spilling Kingdoms is the fourth book in the poetry series. It has a foreword from Ernest G. McClain, emeritus professor of music and a mathematician.

The Beautiful / Palace Prayers 
(2011). Nefisa UK
The fifth book in the series has an introduction by Christopher Reiger. The book is separated into two parts as the title suggests, the latter half being a reproduction of the 2009 art/blog project featured on NPR of the same name (see 'Palace Prayers' the wordpress site). Misdaq wrote the blog under the pseudonym of 'Man in Palace'.

Lefke Automatic / Destiny of Love 
(2012). Nefisa UK
The sixth instalment starts off as a travelogue of Misdaq's journey to seek out a living Sufi master in the Mediterranean. It includes poetry heavily influenced by Sufi concepts and has a glossary of terms as well as an introduction which was written in South Africa on Christmas Day, 2011. The remainder of the book comprises love poems. This book was praised by Khaled Hosseini, who said, "This is lovely, moving work, with a sense of mystery, and the possibility of unexpected discovery, forever at hand. At times open ended, elusive, and abstract, Yusuf Misdaq's poems can also be bold, emphatic, and unafraid."

Collaborations
In November 2006, he performed at a "poetry sama" organised by Q-News at London's RADA alongside Islamic scholar Abdul Hakim Murad & poet Daniel Abdal-Hayy Moore.

Misdaq has expressed an admiration for Suzi Gablik, Robert Fisk and Amy Goodman amongst others on his arts website, nefisa. He also conducted a lengthy interview with illbient dub musician and pioneering CEO of the Wordsound record label Skiz Fernando in 2003, shortly after the Iraq invasion. This was also a special feature on Nefisa.

Misdaq has said that experimental writer Lawrence Ytzhak Braithwaite and poet Daniel Abdal-Hayy Moore are friends of his. Misdaq has written reviews of Moore's works in magazines such as Illume, EMEL & online with DeenPort. After the avant-garde novelist and performer Braithewaite died in 2008, Misdaq dedicated his third album to him.

Throughout 2009 and 2010, Misdaq collaborated with poet and author Raficq Abdulla on two extended poetry rengas, the last of which was performed in Kensington, London. The piece, which went back and forth several times, dealt with topics as varied as the invasion of Gaza, the rivalry between Tennis Champions Roger Federer and Raphael Nadal, and the origin of words. While commenting on the 'beauty' of the performance, Misdaq also said on his Myspace blog that the most telling moment of the evening came before the audience arrived for the performance, when he helped unblock a toilet.

Teaching
Clouds & Oceans: Islam & Creativity taught at New York University Islamic Center, Spring Term, 2010/2011
Creative Writing, Undergraduate classes taught at the University of Brighton, UK.

Discography

Albums
 From a Western Box (2004)
 Flowers & Trees (2005)
 The Hearing (compilation LP for charity Muslimyouth.net )(2005)
 Hippocamp Ruins Sgt. Peppers Lonely Hearts Club Band (mash-up LP with MichL Britsch & Fredo Viola et al.) (2006)
 Le Dual Mule: Experiments in Improvisational Sound (duet LP with Mikrosopht) (2006)
 Maghreb Isha & Space (2010)
 If You Ask Me, Yes (2013)
 Misted Almond Legacy (2017)

Bibliography

Novels
 The Steep Ascent, a novel (2013, UpSet Press, New York)
 Narayan, a novel (2012, unpublished)
 Pieces of a paki, a novel (2007, Nefisa UK / University of Sussex Press)

Poetry
 Lefke Automatic / Destiny of Love, poetry prose & songs (2011, Nefisa UK)
 The Beautiful / Palace Prayers, poetry, prose & songs (2011, Nefisa UK)
 Spilling Kingdoms, poetry & prose (2011, Nefisa UK)
 The Butterfly Gate, poetry & prose (2011, Nefisa UK)
 Into Solidity, poetry & prose (2011, Nefisa UK)
 Brighton Streets, poetry & prose (2010, Nefisa UK)
 Frozen Fountain, an art book (2008, Nizard / Misdaq)

References

External links
 Official Music site
 Official Writing site
 UK Hip-Hop Interview
 Radical Middle Way Interview
 Real Audio Interview on BBC

Year of birth missing (living people)
Living people
Afghan musicians
Afghan writers
Arabic music
British multimedia artists
English documentary filmmakers
English electronic musicians
Hip hop record producers
Musicians from Brighton and Hove
Muslim poets
Pashtun people
People from Brighton
Sufi poets